Borchgrevink is a surname. Notable people with the surname include:

Aage Borchgrevink, Norwegian writer
Carsten Borchgrevink, (1864–1934) Anglo-Norwegian explorer
Leonhard Christian Borchgrevink Holmboe, (1802–1887), Norwegian priest and politician

See also
Borchgrevink Glacier, a glacier in the polar regions
Borchgrevink Nunatak, a nunatak
Borchgrevink Coast, an area in the arctic
Borchgrevink Canyon, an undersea canyon
Mount Borchgrevink, an arctic mountain